The Master General of Ordnance (or MGO) of the Pakistan Army is one of the five principal officers assisting the Chief of Army Staff of the Pakistan Army (COAS) in his duties, operating from army headquarters in Rawalpindi. The other principal officers are the Chief of General Staff (CGS); the Quartermaster General (QMG); the Adjutant General (AG); and the Inspector General for Evaluation and Training (IGT&E).

Major General Syed Shahid Hamid was the first Master General of Ordnance of the Pakistan Army.

List of Master Generals of Ordnance

References

 

Pakistan Army
Pakistan Army appointments